Nick Franklin is the  former Executive Vice President of Next Generation Experience at Walt Disney Parks and Resorts worldwide.  His duties include the development of new experiences at the Disney parks and resorts worldwide, and monitoring and enhancing user experience.
Prior to that, Franklin was Executive Vice President of Global Development and directed operations of Walt Disney Attractions Japan and Disneyland International, supporting Disney's association with The Oriental Land Company, the third-party operator of Tokyo Disney Resort in Japan.  Franklin was also responsible for the growth of new and existing Walt Disney Parks and Resorts, in particular Disney resorts in France, Hong Kong and Japan.

Franklin began his Disney career in Disney's Corporate Strategic Planning department, where his primary responsibility was working with Parks and Resorts on key decisions and long-term strategy for all of its business units. Franklin also was part of the ESPN Zone Opening Team. He was then promoted to Senior Vice President, International Development in 2003 where he oversaw the improvement of Disney Parks worldwide. Franklin was again promoted in 2007 to his former title. He left the company after 17 years of employment by personal choice, wishing to bring his unique strategic edge to other companies. As of April 14, 2015 he became the KB home executive vice president of strategic operations. In 2018, he became president of the Kelly Slater Wave Company, and became Senior Head of Management for Cain Intelligence in 2020.

Franklin is an officer of the board of trustees of the Greater Los Angeles Zoo Association.

References

External links 
 http://corporate.disney.go.com/news/parks_resorts/exe_bios/nickfranklin.html
 http://www.panacheprivee.com/File/Nick_Franklin/

Living people
Princeton University alumni
Year of birth missing (living people)